The 1920 Epsom Derby was a horse race which took place at Epsom Downs on 2 June 1920. It was the 141st running of the Derby and was won by Giles Loder's Spion Kop. The winner was ridden by the American jockey Frank O'Neill and trained by Peter Gilpin.

Race details
 Prize money to winner: £5850
 Number of runners: 19
 Winner's time: 2m 34.8s

The race

The Derby was run on an unusually hot day in front of an estimated crowd of 250,000 including the King and Queen. Spion Kop started at odd of 100/6 (approximately 16/1) in a field of 19 runners. The favourite was the 2000 Guineas winner Tetratema a colt noted for his exceptional early speed but with dubious stamina. Tetratema went into an early lead and set an extremely fast pace as he was challenged by Abbot's Trace (ridden by Steve Donoghue), while O’Neill settled Spion Kop well back in the field. Tetratema dropped back soon after half way and Abbot's Trace led into the straight as Spion Kop made rapid progress from the rear. Spion Kop took the lead three furlongs from the finish and ran on strongly up the straight to win by two lengths from Archaic and Orpheus in a new race record time of 2:34.8. The most dramatic incident of the race occurred in the closing stages when Abbot's Trace was brought down in a collision with Sarchedon, who finished fourth.

Full result

* The distances between the horses are shown in lengths or shorter. shd = short-head; hd = head; PU = pulled up.

Winner's details
Further details of the winner, Spion Kop:

 Foaled: 1917
 Sire: Spearmint; Dam: Hammerkop (Gallinule)
 Owner: Giles Loder
 Breeder: Giles Loder

References

Epsom Derby
 1920
Epsom Derby